Raven  is the common name given to several larger-bodied members of the genus Corvus.

Raven may also refer to:

Arts and entertainment

Fictional characters
 Raven (Ace Comics), a comic book character
 Raven (DC Comics), from the Teen Titans series
 Raven (Guilty Gear), in the Guilty Gear series
 Raven (Tekken), in the Tekken series
 Raven Baxter, title character of the American sitcom television series That's So Raven
 Raven Branwen, a character in the web series RWBY
 Raven Darkhölme, alter ego of Marvel Comics character Mystique
 Raven Hex, in Tarot: Witch of the Black Rose
 Raven Queen, the daughter of the Evil Queen from the Mattel franchise Ever After High
 Jonathon Raven, title character of the American action drama television series Raven
 Vulcan Raven, a character from  the 1998 video game Metal Gear Solid
 Dmitri "Raven" Ravinoff, in the Neal Stephenson book Snow Crash
 Raven Reyes, a character in the television series The 100
 Mr. Raven, in George Macdonald's fantasy novel Lillith
 Raven, in the 2009 film My Queen Karo
 Raven, in The Black Company fantasy novel series
 Raven, in Graham Greene's novel A Gun for Sale (1936)
 Raven, in Faith Erin Hicks' novel Demonology 101
 Raven, a nickname of significance for Hari Seldon in Isaac Asimov's Foundation series
 Raven, the Native American fable who accompanies Jack Horner in the Jack of Fables comic series
 Raven, in the manga series Pandora Hearts
 Raven, in the suspense/thriller film Soul Survivors (2001)
 Raven, the main character in the 1997 HBO animated series Spicy City
 Raven, in T.H.U.N.D.E.R. Agents
 Raven, in Zoids: Chaotic Century/Zoids: Guardian Force

Literature
 Raven (book), a 1982 book about Jim Jones and the People's Temple by Tim Reiterman
 Raven, a 1993 horror novel by Charles L. Grant
 Raven, a 1989 novel by Stanley Morgan
 "The Raven", a narrative poem by American writer Edgar Allan Poe

Music
 Raven (British band), a heavy metal band
 Raven (American band), a blues rock band
 Raven Records, an Australian record label
Raven (Paula Cole album), 2013
Raven (album) by Kelela, 2023
 "Raven", a song by Battle Beast from Battle Beast
 "Raven", a song by the Dave Matthews Band from Busted Stuff

Television
 Raven (1977 TV series), a British television series
 Raven (2002 TV series), a 2002–2010 & 2017–present British children's game show
 Raven (American TV series), a 1992–1993 American action drama television series
 That's So Raven, a 2003–2007 American supernatural comedy television series

Businesses and organizations
 RAVEN (Respecting Aboriginal Values & Environmental Needs),  a charitable organization
 Raven Arms, an American firearms manufacturer
 Raven Industries, an American manufacturer of plastic, electronic and "special apparel" products
 Raven Society, a student society at the University of Virginia
 Raven Software, an American video game developer

Military
 Raven or corvus, a boarding device used by the Romans in the First Punic War
 Raven Forward Air Controllers, fighter pilots used in covert operations during the Vietnam War
 Raven-class minesweeper, a World War II United States Navy class of two minesweepers
 AeroVironment RQ-11 Raven, a short-range UAV used by the U.S. military
 Curtiss O-40 Raven, an unsuccessful American observation aircraft of the 1930s
 General Dynamics–Grumman EF-111A Raven, an electronic warfare aircraft retired in 1998
 Hiller OH-23 Raven, a three-place, light observation helicopter used by the U.S. Army
 , the name of fourteen ships and a shore establishment of the British Royal Navy
 , the name of several United States Navy ships

People
 Raven (given name), a unisex given name
 Raven (surname)
 Raven (drag queen) (born 1979), American drag queen and reality television personality
 Raven (wrestler) (born 1964), American professional wrestler, producer, writer and actor
 Raven Lake, Canadian professional wrestler, mother of Bambi Hall
 A female member of the TV show American Gladiators
 Raven-Symoné, also known as Raven, an American actress

Places

Canada
 Raven, Alberta, Canada, an unincorporated community
 Raven Lake, a lake that straddles the northwestern border of Quebec and northeastern Ontario

United States
 Raven, Illinois, an unincorporated community
 Raven, Kentucky, an unincorporated community
 Raven, Nebraska, an unincorporated community
 Raven, Virginia, a census-designated place
 Raven Creek, Pennsylvania
 Raven Ridge, Colorado and Utah

Elsewhere
 Raven, Bulgaria, a village
 Raven, Gostivar, Republic of Macedonia 
 Raven Crag, a fell in the English Lake District
 Raven Glacier, Greenland
 Sveti Peter, Piran, a village in the Municipality of Piran, southwestern Slovenia, formerly named Raven

Transportation
 Raven (sailboat), an American sailboat design
 Raven Rotorcraft, an American aircraft manufacturer
 Rans S-20 Raven, an American light-sport aircraft design
 SS Raven (1871), a steam barge built for service on Windermere in the English Lake District for the Furness Railway
 Dynamic Sport Raven, a Polish paraglider design
 MY Raven, an excursion vessel built in 1889 as the SY Raven
 Winds Italia Raven, an Italian powered hang glider design
 A class of South Devon Railway 0-4-0 locomotives

Other uses
 Raven (1996 film), a film with Burt Reynolds from 1996
 Raven: A Journal of Vexillology, a peer-reviewed academic journal
 Raven Tales, descriptions of creation stories that involve the mythic figure Raven
 Raven's Progressive Matrices, a nonverbal psychometric test used to measure fluid intelligence
 A sound-analysis software programs produced by the Cornell Lab of Ornithology

See also
The Raven (disambiguation)
Raven-Symoné (born 1985), an American actress who starred in Disney Channel's That's So Raven
Ravens (disambiguation)
Rave (disambiguation)
Raver (disambiguation)